The Newcastle Knights Women are an Australian rugby league team based in Newcastle, New South Wales. The team is part of the Newcastle Knights club and competes in the National Rugby League Women's Premiership (NRLW). The team's home ground is McDonald Jones Stadium. The team has won one premiership over its history (2022).

History
On 11 June 2021, the Newcastle Knights were granted a licence to compete in the 2021 National Rugby League Women's (NRLW) competition. Recently retired Knights player Blake Green was announced as the head coach. The season was planned to commence in August 2021, postponed to October 2021 and further postponed to 2022 due to the ongoing COVID-19 pandemic.

On 1 July 2021, the Knights announced their first ever NRLW signing in Indigenous All Stars and Prime Minister's XIII representative Caitlan Johnston, who was a foundation Tarsha Gale Cup player for the Knights in 2018 before spending two seasons with the Sydney Roosters NRLW side.

On 25 November 2021, it was announced that Knights Tarsha Gale Cup coach Casey Bromilow would be taking on the head coach role after Green had been appointed into a specialist halves role alongside Andrew Johns with Newcastle's NRL side. Jess Skinner was announced as the assistant coach. On the same day, the Knights announced a further six Newcastle and Hunter based signings in Bobbi Law from the Sydney Roosters, Jayme Fressard from the Brisbane Broncos and Georgia Page from the St. George Illawarra Dragons, as well as Phoebe Desmond, Chantelle Graham and Kyra Simon from local teams. Six development players were also announced in Bree Chester, Sophie Clancy, Matilda Jones, Kayla Romaniuk, Jesse Southwell and Tylah Vallance.

On 1 December 2021, the Knights signed nine Kiwi Ferns representatives in Ngatokotoru Arakua, Maitua Feterika, Annetta Nu'uausala, Charntay Poko, Krystal Rota, Charlotte Scanlan, Autumn-Rain Stephens-Daly, Katelyn Vaha'akolo and Kararaina Wira-Kohu, Two days later, the club signed Romy Teitzel from the Brisbane Broncos, AFLW player Paige Parker, rugby sevens player Emma Sykes and North Queensland Gold Stars players Rangimarie Edwards-Bruce, Katie Green, Emma Manzelmann and Tahlulah Tillett.

In January 2022, the Knights signed Kirra Dibb from the New Zealand Warriors after Emma Sykes withdrew from the squad. On 21 February, the 24-woman squad was finalised with the signing of Shannon Evans from the Central Coast Roosters and Romy Teitzel was named team captain, Caitlan Johnston and Krystal Rota named as club captains.

The club played in 5 matches without a win in its inaugural season.

In April 2022, Ronald Griffiths was announced as the new head coach for the upcoming season.

On 18 May 2022, the Knights announced the signing of Australian Jillaroos players Millie Boyle and Tamika Upton for their second season in the competition. Additional notable signings for the 2022 season were Sydney Roosters premiership winning players Yasmin Clydsdale, Olivia Higgins, Simone Karpani, Tayla Predebon, Hannah Southwell, former Jillaroos player Caitlin Moran and former Roosters players Shanice Parker and Kiana Takairangi.

On 16 August 2022, Millie Boyle and Hannah Southwell were appointed co-captains of the club.

After winning 4 of its 5 regular season games, the Knights won their first premiership during the 2022 NRL Women's season, defeating the Parramatta Eels 32-12.

Players

Current squad

Captains

All players that have captained the Newcastle Knights Women's in first-grade.

Coaches
 Casey Bromilow (2021)
 Ronald Griffiths (2022 - present)

Seasons

Club Records

Individual records

Career

Most Games
 Kirra Dibb 12
 Emma Manzelmann 12
 Romy Teitzel 12

Most Points
 Kirra Dibb 42

Most Tries
 Romy Teitzel 5
 Tamika Upton 5

Most Goals
 Kirra Dibb 19

Season

Most Points
 Kirra Dibb (2022) 34

Most Tries
 Tamika Upton (2022) 5

Match

Most Points
 Kirra Dibb (Semi Final, 2022) 14 vs. St. George Illawarra

Most Tries
 Kiana Takairangi (Grand Final, 2022) 2 vs. Parramatta Eels
 Tamika Upton (Semi Final, 2022) 2 vs. St. George Illawarra

Most Goals
 Kirra Dibb (Semi Final, 2022) 5 vs. St. George Illawarra

Margins and Streaks
Biggest winning margin
 

Biggest losing margin

Most consecutive wins
 3  (18 September 2022  2 October 2022)
 3  (21 August 2022  11 September 2022)

Most consecutive losses
 5  (27 February 2022  27 March 2022)

References

External links
Newcastle Knights official website

 
NRL Women's Premiership clubs
Rugby league teams in Newcastle, New South Wales
Sports teams in Newcastle, New South Wales
Women's rugby league teams in Australia